Edgar Normann Christensen (April 13, 1905 – July 13, 1977) was a Norwegian-American boxer who competed in the 1924 Summer Olympics. He was born in Minneapolis.

Edgar Normann Christensen competed in the Olympics on behalf of  Norway in 1924 in Paris.  He was eliminated in the second round of the welterweight class after losing his fight to Al Mello. He later took gold in the middleweight during the European Championship for amateurs in Berlin in 1927.

Under the name Edgar Normann, he fought professionally in the United States from November 1929 to July 1931. His career status after 8 years and 44 fights, 28 wins (including 15 by knockout), 9 losses (2 KO) and 7 draws.

References

External links
Part 5 the boxing tournament

1905 births
1977 deaths
Sportspeople from Minneapolis
Boxers from Minnesota
American people of Norwegian descent
Welterweight boxers
Olympic boxers of Norway
Boxers at the 1924 Summer Olympics
Norwegian male boxers